Anuj Rawat is a talented young cricketer from India who was born in the village of Rooppur in Ram Nagar, Uttarakhand in born 17 October 1999

Anuj Rawat is an Indian cricketer who represents Delhi in domestic cricket and Royal Challengers Bangalore in Indian Premier League. He is a left-handed top order and wicket-keeper.

Anuj Rawat Education 
Anuj Rawat completed his primary education at the Bal Bhavan International School, where he first developed a love for cricket. Later he attended the Delhi University where he graduated with a degree.

Anuj Rawat Debut 
He made his first-class debut for Delhi in the 2017–18 Ranji Trophy on 6 October 2017. He made his Twenty20 debut for Delhi in the 2018–19 Syed Mushtaq Ali Trophy on 21 February 2019. He made his List A debut on 4 October 2019, for Delhi in the 2019–20 Vijay Hazare Trophy.

In the 2020 IPL auction, he was bought by the Rajasthan Royals ahead of the 2020 Indian Premier League. In February 2022, he was bought by the Royal Challengers Bangalore in the 2022 Indian Premier League auction.

References

External links
 

1999 births
Living people
Indian cricketers
Delhi cricketers
Rajasthan Royals cricketers
Royal Challengers Bangalore cricketers
Cricketers from Uttarakhand
People from Nainital district
Wicket-keepers